Cochrane Airport ,  is an airport serving Cochrane, a town in the Aysén Region of Chile. The airport is just northwest of the town, at the foot of Cerro Tamanguito (sv).

The region around Cochrane is mountainous. There are ravines off either end of the runway, with rising terrain beyond.

See also

Transport in Chile
List of airports in Chile

References

External links
Cochrane Airport at OpenStreetMap
Cochrane Airport at OurAirports

Cochrane Airport at FallingRain

Airports in Aysén Region